Major General Sir Basil Alexander Hill,  (23 April 1880 – 31 July 1960) was a British Army officer and rugby union international who represented England from 1903 to 1907. He also captained his country.

Early life
Hill was born on 23 April 1880 in Broughty Ferry.

Rugby union career
Hill made his international debut on 14 February 1903 at Lansdowne Road in the Ireland vs England match.
Of the 9 matches he played for his national side he was on the winning side on 2 occasions.
He played his final match for England on 12 January 1907 at St Helen's, Swansea in the Wales vs England match.

Military career
Hill was commissioned into the Royal Marine Artillery as a second lieutenant in 1897, and promoted to lieutenant on 1 July 1898. He transferred to the Army Ordnance Department in 1908, and eventually retired as a major-general.

He served with the Royal Marine Artillery during the Siege of Tsingtao in 1914 and later at Gallipoli, for which he was Mentioned in Despatches. He later took part in the Egyptian Expeditionary Force, and was twice mentioned in despatches. For his service in the Great War, he received the Distinguished Service Order (DSO) on 1 January 1917 and was promoted brevet lieutenant-colonel.

He was appointed a Companion of the Order of the Bath (CB) in 1937, and knighted as a Knight Commander of the Order of the British Empire (KBE) in 1941. He was Colonel Commandant, Royal Electrical and Mechanical Engineers, 1942–1947. He was a justice of the peace (JP) for Kent.

Hill died on 31 July 1960

References

1880 births
1960 deaths
Companions of the Distinguished Service Order
Companions of the Order of the Bath
English justices of the peace
Knights Commander of the Order of the British Empire
English rugby union players
England international rugby union players
Rugby union forwards
Blackheath F.C. players
Rugby union players from Dundee
People from Broughty Ferry
Kent County RFU players